Telishment is an act by the authorities of punishing a suspect in order to deter future wrongdoers, even though they know that the suspect is innocent. If supporters of these theories believe in the effectiveness of telishment as a deterrent, opponents claim that they must bite the bullet and also hold that telishment is ethically justified.

See also 
The Ones Who Walk Away from Omelas

Sources 

Ethics
Utilitarianism
Punishment